William Lilly (1602–1681) was an English astrologer and occultist.

William Lilly may refer to:
William Lilly (congressman) (1821–1893)
William Lily (grammarian) (1468–1522), English scholar and Latin grammarian
William Samuel Lilly (1840–1919), English barrister and writer
William Liley (1929–1983), New Zealand surgeon and perinatal physiologist